Precision engineering is a subdiscipline of electrical engineering, software engineering, electronics engineering, mechanical engineering, and optical engineering concerned with designing machines, fixtures, and other structures that have exceptionally low tolerances, are repeatable, and are stable over time. These approaches have applications in machine tools, MEMS, NEMS, optoelectronics design, and many other fields.

Overview 
Professors Hiromu Nakazawa and Pat McKeown provide the following list of goals for precision engineering:

 Create a highly precise movement.
 Reduce the dispersion of the product's or part's function.
 Eliminate fitting and promote assembly, especially automatic assembly.
 Reduce the initial cost.
 Reduce the running cost.
 Extend the life span.
 Enable the design safety factor to be lowered.
 Improve interchangeability of components so that corresponding parts made by other factories or firms can be used in their place.
 Improve quality control through higher machine accuracy capabilities and hence reduce scrap, rework, and conventional inspection.
 Achieve a greater wear/fatigue life of components.
 Make functions independent of one another.
 Achieve greater miniaturization and packing densities.
 Achieve further advances in technology and the underlying sciences.

Technical Societies 
 American Society for Precision Engineering
 euspen - European Society for Precision Engineering and Nanotechnology
 JSPE- The Japan Society for Precision Engineering
 DSPE - Dutch Society for Precision Engineering
 SPETA - Singapore Precision Engineering and Technology Association

See also 
 Abbe error
 Accuracy and precision
 Flexures
 Kinematic coupling
 Measurement uncertainty
 Kinematic determinacy

References

External links 
 Precision Engineering, the Journal of the International Societies for Precision Engineering and Nanotechnology

Mechanical engineering

Precision Engineering Centre at Cranfield University
History of Precision Engineering